Paul Ramiha "Pāora" Winitana (born 6 December 1976) is a New Zealand former professional basketball player who played the majority of his career in the New Zealand National Basketball League (NZNBL) for the Hawke's Bay Hawks. He was ordained as a Mormon bishop in 2005 and chooses not to play basketball on Sundays.

High school
Winitana attended Hastings Boys' High School and played for the school's A1 team in 1994 where he scored a New Zealand secondary school record for points scored in a single game against Central Hawke's Bay where he scored 96 points. In 1995, he attended the Church College of New Zealand and helped his team defeat Palmerston North Boys High in the National secondary school boys final. He was selected to the all-tournament team, and was chosen to play as one of the top ten high school players in the country against the country's top ten second division players; his team lost the match but he was awarded the game MVP.

Professional career
In 1996, Winitana played his first year of professional basketball for the North Harbour Vikings and won the NZNBL Rookie of the Year award. After demonstrating his world-class potential in the NZNBL, Winitana was offered several opportunities to play basketball in the United States, including a full scholarship to the University of Wisconsin, Brigham Young University, Ohio State University, and several others. But he turned them down to go on a two-year mission for the Church of Jesus Christ of Latter-Day Saints. The mission also meant that he missed out on the chance to represent New Zealand at the 2000 Sydney Olympic Games.

In 2001, Winitana returned to the NZNBL and played for the North Harbour Kings (one game) and the Hawke's Bay Hawks (nine games).

In 2002, Winitana was selected to the Tall Blacks squad, making his international basketball debut for New Zealand. He played for the Tall Blacks in the 2002 FIBA World Championships where they came fourth – New Zealand's highest ever placing. He also played for the Harbour Kings in 2002 and averaged 16.7 points in 15 games.

In 2003, Winitana returned to his hometown Hawke's Bay Hawks and after averaging 20 points per game in 17 games, he was signed by the New Zealand Breakers for the club's inaugural season in the Australian NBL. He continued to play for the Hawke's Bay Hawks in the coming years and led his team to the 2006 NZNBL championship in 2006 while garnering the league MVP award.

In 2007, Winitana re-joined the New Zealand Breakers for the 2007–08 NBL season. The following season, he played for the Adelaide 36ers. In 74 ANBL games over three seasons, Winitana averaged 3.6 points and 1.5 rebounds per game.

In 2009, Winitana moved to the Christchurch Cougars and played two seasons for them before returning to the Hawks in 2011. After the Hawks started the 2015 season with a 4–8 win–loss record, the club released coach Liam Flynn from his head coaching duties and replaced him with Winitana, already the team's co-captain alongside Jarrod Kenny. He returned to the Hawks for the 2016 season, but relinquished the captaincy role. Coming into the 2017 season, Winitana decided not to return to the Hawks but chose to focus his time and energy into his Academy that he founded in 2011. He ended his career with 304 NBL games, which is ranked eighth all-time. After his career Paora was the first player in Hawke's Bay History to have his jersey retired by the Hawks on 13 May 2017.

National team career
Winitana played for the Tall Blacks at the 2002 FIBA World Championship, the 2004 Summer Olympics in Athens, the 2006 Commonwealth Games in Melbourne, and the 2006 FIBA World Championship.

Personal
Winitana and his wife Tia have six children. His son, also named Pāora, plays for BYU Cougars in NCAA Division I.

References

External links
Pāora Winitana at FIBA.com

Pāora Winitana at mormon.org I'm a Mormon
Basketball: The Bishop's move
 http://archive.fiba.com/pages/eng/fa/team/p/sid/3118/tid/337/_/2002_World_Championship_for_Men_/index.html

1976 births
Living people
Adelaide 36ers players
Basketball players at the 2004 Summer Olympics
Basketball players at the 2006 Commonwealth Games
Christchurch Cougars players
Commonwealth Games medallists in basketball
Commonwealth Games silver medallists for New Zealand
Hawke's Bay Hawks players
New Zealand men's basketball players
New Zealand leaders of the Church of Jesus Christ of Latter-day Saints
Olympic basketball players of New Zealand
People educated at the Church College of New Zealand
People educated at Hastings Boys' High School
Shooting guards
Sportspeople from Hastings, New Zealand
2006 FIBA World Championship players
2002 FIBA World Championship players
Medallists at the 2006 Commonwealth Games